The 1880 United States presidential election in West Virginia took place on November 2, 1880, as part of the 1880 United States presidential election. West Virginia voters chose five representatives, or electors, to the Electoral College, who voted for president and vice president.

West Virginia was won by General Winfield Scott Hancock (D–Pennsylvania), running with former Representative William Hayden English, with 50.95 percent of the popular vote, against Representative James Garfield (R-Ohio), running with the 10th chairman of the New York State Republican Executive Committee Chester A. Arthur, with 41.05 percent of the vote and representative James B. Weaver (G–Iowa), running with Barzillai J. Chambers, a former Confederate, with 8.00 percent of the popular vote.

Results

Results by county

Notes

References 

West Virginia
1880
1880 West Virginia elections